The 1895 Haskell Indians football team was an American football team that represented the Haskell Indian Institute (now known as Haskell Indian Nations University) as an independent during the 1895 college football season. Prior to the fall of 1895, Haskell had fielded a baseball team.  The 1895 season was the school's first competing in football.  No record has been found identifying a coach for the team.

Schedule

References

Haskell
Haskell Indian Nations Fighting Indians football seasons
Haskell Indians football